Aperture Hand Lab is a virtual reality (VR) game developed by Canadian studio Cloudhead Games and published by Valve, released for Windows on June 25, 2019. It is a tech demo that showcases the functions of the hand, knuckle, and finger tracking technology used by the Valve Index VR headset. The HTC Vive headset is also supported. The game is set in the Portal universe.

Gameplay 
The gameplay consists of several tests conducted by the "personality cores" seen in The Lab. These tests all involve using hand and finger gestures to progress. The player will get different reactions and results depending on what gestures used, such as the middle finger and devil horns.

Development 
In late 2014, Cloudhead Games was approached by Valve to join them at their SteamVR reveal summit, and it was at that summit that the staff at Cloudhead Games decided their vision of VR's future was roomscale. Since the summit, Cloudhead has provided tech demos for every major SteamVR innovation, with Aperture Hand Lab being focused around the Valve Index's finger tracking.

References 

2019 video games
Adventure games
Valve Index games
HTC Vive games
Windows games
Windows-only games
Portal (series)
Valve Corporation games
Single-player video games
Video games developed in Canada